Claude Ecken (born Claude Eckenschwiller) is a French science fiction writer. He was born in Alsace in 1954.

Fiction

Novels

 La mémoire totale (1985)
 L'univers en pièce (1987)
 La peste verte (1987)
 Auditions coupables (1988)
 De silence et de feu (1989)
 Les enfants du silence (1989)
 L'autre Cécile (1990)
 Le cri du corps (1990)
 Enfer clos (1997)
 Petites vertus virtuelles (1999)
 Les hauts esprits (2005)
 Le monde tous droits réservés (2005)

References

French science fiction writers
Living people
French male novelists
Year of birth missing (living people)